Chitonida is an order of chitons.

Taxonomy
 Suborder Chitonina Thiele, 1910
 Superfamily Chitonoidea Rafinesque, 1815
 Family †Ochmazochitonidae Hoare et Smith, 1984
 †Ochmazochiton Hoare et Smith, 1984
 Family Ischnochitonidae Dall, 1889
 Ischnochiton Gray, 1847
 Stenochiton Adams et Angas, 1864
 Stenoplax Carpenter) Dall, 1879
 Lepidozona Pilsbry, 1892
 Stenosemus Middendorff, 1847
 Subterenochiton Iredale et Hull, 1924
 Thermochiton Saito et Okutani, 1990
 Connexochiton Kaas, 1979
 Tonicina Thiele, 1906
 Family Callistoplacidae Pilsbry, 1893
 Ischnoplax Dall, 1879
 Callistochiton Carpenter) Dall
 Callistoplax Dall, 1882
 Ceratozona Dall, 1882
 Calloplax Thiele, 1909
 Family Chaetopleuridae Plate, 1899
 Chaetopleura Shuttleworth, 1853
 Dinoplax Carpenter MS, Dall, 1882
 Family Loricidae Iredale et Hull, 1923
 Lorica Adams & Adams, 1852
 Loricella Pilsbry, 1893
 Oochiton Ashby, 1929
 Family Callochitonidae Plate, 1901
 Callochiton Gray, 1847
 Eudoxochiton Shuttleworth, 1853
 Vermichiton Kaas, 1979
 Family Chitonidae Rafinesque, 1815
 Subfamily Chitoninae Rafinesque, 1815
 Chiton Linnaeus, 1758
 Amaurochiton Thiele, 1893
 Radsia Gray, 1847
 Sypharochiton Thiele, 1893
 Nodiplax Beu, 1967
 Rhyssoplax Thiele, 1893
 Teguloaplax Iredale & Hull, 1926
 Mucrosquama Iredale, 1893
 Subfamily Toniciinae Pilsbry, 1893
 Tonicia Gray, 1847
 Onithochiton Gray, 1847
 Subfamily Acanthopleurinae Dall, 1889
 Acanthopleura Guilding, 1829
 Liolophura Pilsbry, 1893
 Enoplochiton Gray, 1847
 Squamopleura Nierstrasz, 1905
 Superfamily Schizochitonoidea Dall, 1889
 Family Schizochitonidae Dall, 1889
 Incissiochiton Van Belle, 1985
 Schizochiton Gray, 1847
 Suborder Acanthochitonina Bergenhayn, 1930
 Superfamily Mopalioidea Dall, 1889
 Family Tonicellidae Simroth, 1894
 Subfamily Tonicellinae Simroth, 1894
 Lepidochitona Gray, 1821
 Particulazona Kaas, 1993
 Boreochiton Sars, 1878
 Tonicella Carpenter, 1873
 Nuttallina (Carpenter) Dall, 1871
 Spongioradsia Pilsbry, 1894
 Oligochiton Berry, 1922
 Subfamily Juvenichitoninae Sirenko, 1975
 Juvenichiton Sirenko, 1975
 Micichiton Sirenko, 1975
 Nanichiton Sirenko, 1975
 Family Schizoplacidae Bergenhayn, 1955
 Schizoplax Dall, 1878
 Family Mopaliidae Dall, 1889
 Subfamily Heterochitoninae Van Belle, 1978
 Heterochiton Fucini, 1912
 Allochiton Fucini, 1912
 Subfamily Mopaliinae Dall, 1889
 Aerilamma Hull, 1924
 Guildingia Pilsbry, 1893
 Frembleya Adams, 1866
 Diaphoroplax Iredale, 1914
 Plaxiphora Gray, 1847
 Placiphorina Kaas & Van Belle, 1994
 Nuttallochiton Plate, 1899
 Mopalia Gray, 1847
 Maorichiton Iredale, 1914
 Placiphorella (Carpenter MS) Dall, 1879
 Katharina Gray, 1847
 Amicula Gray, 1847
 Superfamily Cryptoplacoidea Adams & A. Adams, 1858
 Family Acanthochitonidae Pilsbry, 1893
 Subfamily Acanthochitoninae Pilsbry, 1893
 Acanthochitona Gray, 1921
 Craspedochiton Shuttleworth, 1853
 Spongiochiton (Carpenter MS) Dall, 1882
 Notoplax Adams, 1861
 Pseudotonicia Ashby, 1928
 Bassethullia Pilsbry, 1928
 Americhiton Watters, 1990
 Choneplax (Carpenter MS) Dall, 1882
 Cryptoconchus (de Blainville MS) Burrow, 1815
 Subfamily Cryptochitoninae Pilsbry, 1893
 Cryptochiton Middendorff, 1847
 Family Hemiarthridae Sirenko, 1997
 Hemiarthrum Carpenter in Dall, 1876
 Weedingia Kaas, 1988
 Family Choriplacidae Ashby, 1928
 Choriplax Pilsbry, 1894
 Family Cryptoplacidae Adams & Adams, 1858
 Cryptoplax Blainville, 1818

References

External links
 Chitonida at UniProt.org

Chitons